Jack Welsh (20 October 1924 – 14 April 2012) was  a former Australian rules footballer who played with Footscray in the Victorian Football League (VFL). His son Peter also played for Footscray.

Notes

External links 
		

1924 births
2012 deaths
Australian rules footballers from Victoria (Australia)
Western Bulldogs players
Yarraville Football Club players